Čadca District (okres Čadca) is a district in
the Žilina Region of northern central Slovakia, in the Kysuce region. It had been established in 1923 and the current borders exist from 1996. Forest covers 58% of the district area. It is one of the populous Slovak district, population density is above Slovak average. Economy basis is performed by engineering, metal and wood processing industry. In the district are several winter and skiing resorts, foremost Oščadnica and Makov. Administrative seat is town Čadca, however, many locals daily travel to Žilina for work, shopping, or education.

Municipalities

References

External links 
 Official site

 
Districts of Slovakia